Boi-Ngo (stylized as BOI-NGO) is the sixth studio album by American new wave band Oingo Boingo, released in 1987.

Production
Boi-Ngo was the third Oingo Boingo album to be self-produced by Danny Elfman and Steve Bartek (including So-Lo). The tracks "Pain", "We Close Our Eyes" and "Not My Slave" were released as singles.

Several other songs, "Remember My Name," "Inside", "Mama" and "Find You", were recorded for the album but not included. An earlier song, "Cinderella Undercover", first performed in 1981, was also recorded but cut from release. "Mama" saw a limited release on a 7-inch vinyl box set edition of Boi-Ngo as the album's final track. New recordings of both "Cinderella Undercover" and "Mama" were subsequently featured on the "live in the studio" album Boingo Alive in 1988. The song "Happy" was also recorded in the album sessions for release on the Summer School soundtrack, under Danny Elfman's name.

In film and television
"Home Again" appears over the end credits of the movies Wisdom (1986) and Home Alone 3 (1997).

"Not My Slave" appears in the film Something Wild (1986), heard briefly on a car radio. The version used in the film (and subsequently included on the soundtrack) is a different mix than the album version.

"We Close Our Eyes" appears in the final scene of the final episode of Psych, "The Break-Up" (2014), and continues through the closing credits.

Reissue
In 2022, Rubellan Remasters announced that they would be issuing a remastered version of Boi-Ngo on both colored vinyl and CD, the latter as an expanded edition with six bonus tracks.

Track listing

Personnel 

Oingo Boingo
 John Avila – bass guitar, vocals
 Steve Bartek – guitars
 Mike Bacich – keyboards
 Danny Elfman – vocals, rhythm guitar
 Johnny (Vatos) Hernandez – drums, percussion
 Sam Phipps – tenor saxophone
 Leon Schneiderman – baritone saxophone
 Dale Turner – trumpet

Additional musicians
 Bruce Fowler – trombone
 Carmen Twillie – background vocals ("Pain")
 Maxine Waters – background vocals ("Pain")
 Michael Vlatkovich – trombone

Technical
 Danny Elfman – co-producer
 Steve Bartek – co-producer
 Bill Jackson – engineer; mixing ("Where Do All My Friends Go", "Elevator Man", "Not My Slave", "Outrageous")
 Michael Frondelli – mixing ("Home Again", "New Generation", "Pain")
 Humberto Gatica – mixing ("We Close Our Eyes", "My Life")
 John Avila – deputy vocal producer
 Laura Engel – studio production assistant
 David Knight – second recording engineer
 Jimmy Preziosi H.R.E. – second recording engineer, second mixing engineer (Sunset Sound)
 Judy Clapp – second mixing engineer (Capitol) 
 Karen Siegal – second mixing engineer (Lion Share)
 Wally Traugott – mastering
 Vartan – art direction
 Mike Fink – design
 Aaron Rapoport – photography

Charts

References 

Oingo Boingo albums
1987 albums
Albums produced by Danny Elfman
Albums produced by Steve Bartek
MCA Records albums